Théodore Robitaille,  (29 January 1834 – 17 August 1897) was a Canadian physician, politician, and the fourth Lieutenant Governor of Quebec.

Born in Varennes, Lower Canada, the son of Louis-Adolphe Robitaille (pronounced "ro-bee-tie") and Marie-Justine Monjeau, he was baptized as Louis-François-Christophe-Théodore. A physician, he graduated from McGill College in 1858 and settled in New Carlisle, Quebec. In 1861, he was elected to the Legislative Assembly of the Province of Canada for the riding of Bonaventure. In 1867, he was elected to the House of Commons of Canada. A Conservative he was re-elected in 1872, an 1873 ministerial by-election, 1874, and 1878. In 1873, he was appointed Receiver General.

In 1871, he was elected to the Legislative Assembly of Quebec in Bonaventure and served until 1874 when holding a federal and provincial seat was abolished. From 1879 to 1884, he was the Lieutenant Governor of Quebec. Notably, during his tenure he commissioned Calixa Lavallée and Sir Adolphe-Basile Routhier to prepare the music and French lyrics to what would become Canada's national anthem, O Canada. In 1885, he was appointed to the Senate representing the senatorial division of Gulf, Quebec. He served until his death in New Carlisle, Quebec in 1897.

Archives 
There are Théodore Robitaille fonds at Library and Archives Canada and Bibliothèque et Archives nationales du Québec.

References

1834 births
1897 deaths
Physicians from Quebec
Canadian senators from Quebec
Conservative Party of Canada (1867–1942) MPs
Conservative Party of Canada (1867–1942) senators
Conservative Party of Quebec MNAs
Lieutenant Governors of Quebec
McGill University alumni
Members of the House of Commons of Canada from Quebec
Members of the Legislative Assembly of the Province of Canada from Canada East
Members of the King's Privy Council for Canada
People from Gaspésie–Îles-de-la-Madeleine
People from Varennes, Quebec
French Quebecers